Sergeant of the Colonial Regiment is an early 20th century painting by French artist Albert Marquet. It is in the collection of the Metropolitan Museum of Art in New York city. 

Done in oil on canvas, the painting depicts an assistant to a quartermaster-corporal of the Troupes coloniales, the colonial French army. The painting has been cited as being one of Marquet's few portraits and an example of the influence of Fauvism in his work. 

In addition to the painting in the collection of the Met, a second copy of the work is on display at the Musée des Beaux-Arts in Bordeaux, France.

The painting is on view at the Metropolitan Museum of Art in Gallery 962.

References 

Paintings in the collection of the Metropolitan Museum of Art
1906 paintings
1907 paintings